Ephraim Cook (Cooke) (1 June 1737 in Kingston, Massachusetts - 17 November 1821, Rockville, Nova Scotia) was a mariner and prominent merchant who was instrumental in establishing Halifax, Mahone Bay, Blockhouse and Chebogue, Nova Scotia.  He also participated in the French and Indian War, including the Expulsion of the Acadians.  He was the first Registrar of Deeds (1767) and the first Justice of the Peace in Yarmouth County.

In 1749 Cook commanded the ship Baltimore and transported 255 settlers as part of Edward Cornwallis' expedition to settle Halifax.  He fell out of favour with Cornwallis and went to jail for insulting a judge.

Five years later, during the French and Indian War, Cook established the settlement of Mahone Bay under the protection of Captain Thomas Lewis (mariner) and his rangers (1754).  He built the first ship in Mahone Bay, the snow Edward (1754).

In 1755, Cook was captain of the snow Edward, and departed with 278 Acadians from Annapolis Royal, Nova Scotia on 8 December 1755.   The ship were blown off course by violent storms and arrived in New London, Connecticut on May 22, 1756.  98 Acadians (35%) died en route because of disease.

After the Raid on Lunenburg (1756), he built a block house to protect Mahone Bay (in the present-day community of Blockhouse). He lost his leg while building the blockhouse and returned to Massachusetts.

In 1757, along with Joshua Mauger, Cook pushed Governor Charles Lawrence to establish an elected assembly.

In 1763, Cook established Chebogue and was the first to settle Lower Melbourne, Nova Scotia and is the namesake of the near-by Cooks Beach.  He established the most profitable fishing industry in Western Nova Scotia.  He was also the leader of the local militia.

Cook married Louisa Ring on March 30, 1764. They had eleven children. Captain Cook died in 1821 and was buried on his farm in Lower Melbourne, but his headstone is in the Chebogue Cemetery.

Legacy 
 namesake of Cooks Beach (Nova Scotia), Cook Harbor, Yarmouth County

References 

History of Nova Scotia

1737 births
1821 deaths